is a railway station on the Shinetsu Main Line in the city of Jōetsu, Niigata, Japan, operated by East Japan Railway Company (JR East). The station also has a freight terminal operated by Japan Freight Railway Company (JR Freight).

Lines
Kuroi Station is served by the Shin'etsu Main Line, and is 2.7 kilometers from the terminus of the line at Naoetsu Station.

Station layout
The station consists of one ground-level island platform with an elevated station building located above and at a right angle to the platform. The station is unattended.

Platforms

History

The station opened on 1 July 1902, as a freight station of the Hokuetsu Railway, which was nationalized in 1907. Passenger service began on 1 September 1906. With the privatization of Japanese National Railways (JNR) on 1 April 1987, the station came under the control of JR East.

Surrounding area

See also
 List of railway stations in Japan

References

External links

 JR East station information 

Railway stations in Niigata Prefecture
Stations of East Japan Railway Company
Stations of Japan Freight Railway Company
Railway stations in Japan opened in 1902
Shin'etsu Main Line
Jōetsu, Niigata